The Women's team sprint at the UEC European Track Championships was first contested at Pruszków, Poland in 2010.

As of 2016, the team sprint consists of a qualifying round, first round and the medal finals.

Medalists

References

2010 Results
2011 Results
2012 Results

 
Women's team sprint
Women's team sprint